The 1995 Swedish Golf Tour, known as the Lancôme Tour for sponsorship reasons, was the tenth season of the Swedish Golf Tour, a series of professional golf tournaments for women held in Sweden.

1995 was the fifth and final year with Lancôme as the main sponsor. Fewer professionals than previously participated this season as all tournaments were scheduled opposite an LET event. Tournaments Ängsö Ladies Open, Esab Ladies Open and Härjedalen Ladies Open were discontinued, but Körunda Ladies Open and Sölvesborg Ladies Open were added to the schedule. 

Amateur Mia Löjdahl won three tournaments, but ineligible for prize money and the OoM, Åsa Gottmo won her second straight Order of Merit.

Schedule
The season consisted of 6 tournaments played between May and September, where one event was included on the 1995 Ladies European Tour.

Order of Merit

Source:

See also
1995 Swedish Golf Tour (men's tour)

References

External links
Official homepage of the Swedish Golf Tour

Swedish Golf Tour (women)
Swedish Golf Tour (women)